Anarsia ovula is a moth in the family Gelechiidae. It was described by Kyu-Tek Park and Margarita Gennadievna Ponomarenko in 1996. It is found in Thailand.

The wingspan is about 17 mm. The forewings are light brown, speckled with creamy white scales, a small elongate costal mark with two inconspicuous spots before it and another one beyond it. The hindwings are grey.

References

ovula
Moths described in 1996
Moths of Asia